Tomislav Duka (born 7 September 1992) is a Croatian footballer who plays for FK Žalgiris in the A lyga.

Club career 
Duka went through the youth teams of his hometown clubs HNK Hajduk Split and RNK Split, joining the latter at the age of 15, subsequently moving up to the club's senior side. The club's third-choice goalkeeper after Andrija Vuković and Danijel Zagorac, he went on a series of loans. First, the fourth-tier Kamen Ivanbegovina, which he helped achieve promotion to the Treća HNL Jug, he moved on to third-tier NK Zagora Unešić and then NK Imotski, which he, helped achieve promotion to the Druga HNL. After the departure of Andrija Vuković, Duka became the substitute of Danijel Zagorac, finally getting his chance to debut in the Prva HNL in March 2016, at the age of 23, in face of Zagorac's upcoming departure from the club. He gained some media recognition after starring in RNK Split's away 0-0 draw against HNK Rijeka, being hailed by the local media as the team's hero after the match.

After joining NK Istra 1961 in January 2020, Duka returned to NK Zagora Unešić in the Croatian Third Football League on 11 September 2020.

Honours

Club
CFR Cluj
Liga I: 2017–18

 FK Žalgiris
A lyga: 2021, 2022

References

External links
 
 

1992 births
Living people
Footballers from Split, Croatia
Association football goalkeepers
Croatian footballers
RNK Split players
NK Zagora Unešić players
NK Imotski players
CFR Cluj players
HNK Hajduk Split players
NK Istra 1961 players
FK Žalgiris players
Croatian Football League players
Liga I players
A Lyga players
Croatian expatriate footballers
Expatriate footballers in Romania
Croatian expatriate sportspeople in Romania
Expatriate footballers in Lithuania
Croatian expatriate sportspeople in Lithuania